= Fasken Center =

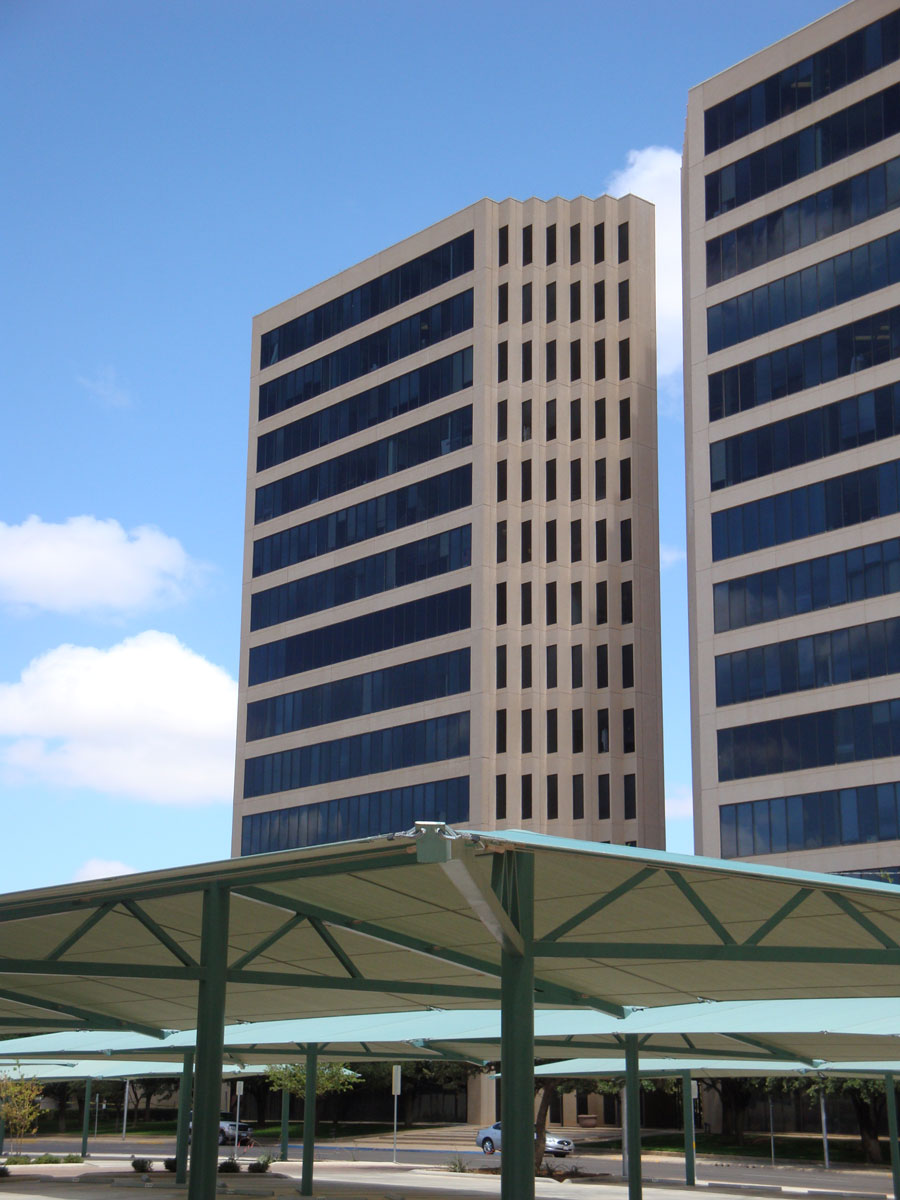
- Fasken Center
- Interactive map of the Fasken Center area

General information
- Status: Completed
- Type: Commercial Office
- Location: 500/550 W. Texas Ave. Midland
- Coordinates: 31.998741°N 102.080412°W
- Construction started: 1973
- Completed: Tower I in 1974 & Tower II in 1982
- Opening: 1974 & 1982
- Owner: Midland FC, Ltd.

Height
- Roof: 182 ft. (364 ft with both towers combined)
- Top floor: 14

Technical details
- Floor count: 28 (both tower floors combined)
- Floor area: 419,960 sq ft (39,016 m^{2})

The Fasken Center is a complex of two 182-foot-tall (55 m) high-rise buildings in the downtown business district of Midland, Texas.

The first tower was built in 1974 with fourteen floors. In 1982, the second tower was constructed to mirror the first tower. It, too, has fourteen floors. The Fasken Center is sometimes referred to by locals as the Twin Towers of Midland. Many oil and gas companies are tenants of the buildings, as well as a bank.
